Oneonethousand is the third full-length studio album by American post-hardcore band Burden of a Day. The album was released on May 12, 2009. It is their second album with Rise Records, and the first with lead singer Kyle Tamosaitis.The album debuted at #21 on the Billboard Top Heatseekers chart and #25 on the Billboard Top Christian Albums chart.

Track listing

References

2009 albums
Burden of a Day albums
Rise Records albums
Albums produced by Andrew Wade